Word blindness may refer to:
 Dyslexia, a developmental communication disorder
 Alexia (condition), an acquired communication disorder